Cargo cult science is a pseudoscientific method of research that favors evidence that confirms an assumed hypothesis. In contrast with the scientific method, there is no vigorous effort to disprove or delimit the hypothesis. The term cargo cult science was first used by physicist Richard Feynman during his 1974 commencement address at the California Institute of Technology.

Cargo cults are religious practices that have appeared in many traditional tribal societies in the wake of interaction with technologically advanced cultures. They focus on obtaining the material wealth (the "cargo") of the advanced culture by imitating the actions they believe cause the appearance of cargo: by building landing strips, mock aircraft, mock radios, and the like. Similarly, although cargo cult sciences employ the trappings of the scientific method, they fail—like an airplane with no motor—to deliver anything of value.

Feynman's speech 

Feynman adapted the speech into the final chapter of his book Surely You're Joking, Mr. Feynman!. He based the phrase on a concept in anthropology, the cargo cult, which describes how some pre-industrialized cultures interpreted technologically sophisticated visitors as religious or supernatural figures who brought boons of cargo. Later, in an effort to call for a second visit the natives would develop and engage in complex religious rituals, mirroring the previously observed behavior of the visitors manipulating their machines but without understanding the true nature of those tasks. Just as cargo cultists create mock airports that fail to produce airplanes, cargo cult scientists conduct flawed research that superficially resembles the scientific method, but which fails to produce scientifically useful results.

The following is an excerpt from a speech (taken from the book):

In the South Seas there is a cargo cult of people. During the war they saw airplanes land with lots of good materials, and they want the same thing to happen now. So they've arranged to imitate things like runways, to put fires along the sides of the runways, to make a wooden hut for a man to sit in, with two wooden pieces on his head like headphones and bars of bamboo sticking out like antennas—he's the controller—and they wait for the airplanes to land. They're doing everything right. The form is perfect. It looks exactly the way it looked before. But it doesn't work. No airplanes land. So I call these things cargo cult science, because they follow all the apparent precepts and forms of scientific investigation, but they're missing something essential, because the planes don't land.

Feynman cautioned that to avoid becoming cargo cult scientists, researchers must avoid fooling themselves, be willing to question and doubt their own theories and their own results, and investigate possible flaws in a theory or an experiment. He recommended that researchers adopt an unusually high level of honesty which is rarely encountered in everyday life, and gave examples from advertising, politics, and psychology to illustrate the everyday dishonesty which should be unacceptable in science. Feynman cautioned,

We've learned from experience that the truth will come out. Other experimenters will repeat your experiment and find out whether you were wrong or right. Nature's phenomena will agree or they'll disagree with your theory. And, although you may gain some temporary fame and excitement, you will not gain a good reputation as a scientist if you haven't tried to be very careful in this kind of work. And it's this type of integrity, this kind of care not to fool yourself, that is missing to a large extent in much of the research in cargo cult science.

An example of cargo cult science is an experiment that uses another researcher's results in lieu of an experimental control. Since the other researcher's conditions might differ from those of the present experiment in unknown ways, differences in the outcome might have no relation to the independent variable under consideration. Other examples, given by Feynman, are from educational research, psychology (particularly parapsychology), and physics. He also mentions other kinds of dishonesty, for example, falsely promoting one's research to secure funding. Feynman believed a scientist of integrity must attempt to give out as much information as possible about their experiments so others could accurately appraise their contribution.

Example in specific experiments and results 
The oil drop experiment: The history of published results for this experiment is an example given in Surely You're Joking, Mr. Feynman!, in which each new publication slowly and quietly drifted more and more away from the initial (erroneous) values given by Robert Millikan toward the correct value, rather than all having a random distribution from the start around what is now believed to be the correct result. This slow drift in the chronological history of results is unnatural and suggests that nobody wanted to contradict the previous one, instead submitting only concordant results for publication.

Proposed solutions 
In his commencement address, Richard Feynman stated his belief that the antidote to both cargo cult science and pseudoscience is scientific integrity, which he describes as, "a kind of leaning over backwards" to make sure scientists do not fool themselves or others. According to Feynman an ethical scientist must make the extra effort to ensure that their methods and results are transparent, allowing other people to accurately appraise and understand the scientist's research. Feynman uses the case of a Wesson cooking oil advertisement as an example of an unethical and deceptive use of science that delivers nothing of value. The advertisement made the claim that the oil would not soak through food. In reality, no oil will soak through food if it is cold enough, and all oil will soak through food if hot enough. Since these facts would not advance Wesson's agenda, these facts were not made readily available for consumers.

See also

References

External links 
 Cargo Cult Science by Richard P. Feynman, 1974

Richard Feynman
Pseudoscience
Types of scientific fallacy